Kerala Janapaksham ('Kerala People's Party') is a political party in Kerala, India. The party is led by K. Raman Pillai. Pillai is the president of the party. Pillai had previously been a leader of the Bharatiya Janata Party, but formed Kerala Janapaksham in 2007. Baby Ambatt was appointed general secretary of the party in May 2010.

The party offered critical support to the Left Democratic Front.

The party had a cultural wing, Bharatiya Janapaksham.
The party had also a trade union wing Kerala Thozhilali Paksham K.Raghunath is this President

Return to Bharatiya Janata Party 

Kerala Janapaksham party founding president K. Raman Pillai announced that the party would be dissolved and that they would return to Bharatiya Janata Party in March 2016

References

2007 establishments in Kerala
Bharatiya Janata Party breakaway groups
Political parties established in 2007
Political parties in Kerala